The Gerin Varivol was a 1930s French research aircraft designed and built by Jacques Gerin. Only one aircraft was flown during 1936 before it was destroyed in an accident.

Design and development
The Varivol was an odd looking biplane with a deep and bulky fuselage with a knife edge rear where the rudder was attached and a braced variable-incidence tailplane was mounted on top of the rear fuselage. The unique feature of the aircraft were the two narrow-chord biplane wings in an inverted sesquiplane configuration. The wings were wire-braced and had one interplane strut on each side. It was also possible to change the camber of the wings when extended. The Varivol was powered by a  Salmson radial piston engine with a two-bladed propeller.

It was first tested in a wind tunnel at Chalais-Meudon before starting test flying in March 1936. The aircraft continued to fly successfully until November 1936 when it was destroyed in a fatal crash, an investigation determined the accident was not due to the variable-area wings.

Further developments
Further development of the Varivol concept was carried out with the Gérin 1938 V.6E Varivol Racer a sleek monoplane racing aircraft that was built just prior to and during World War II,  being put into storage after the war. The aircraft can be seen at the Musee Regional de l'Air at Angers in France.

Specifications

References

Notes

Bibliography

1930s French experimental aircraft
Single-engined tractor aircraft
Aircraft first flown in 1936
Sesquiplanes